Eufemia may refer to:
 Eufemia, a Greek female given name
 Catarina Eufémia, an illiterate harvester from Alentejo, Portugal
 Frank Eufemia, a former Major League Baseball relief pitcher

See also

 Euphemia (disambiguation) 
 Santa Eufemia (disambiguation)
 Sant'Eufemia (disambiguation)